Abdullah Khan (born 15 February 1965) is a former Pakistani first-class cricketer who played for Karachi and Pakistan Steels. He played 35 First-class and 26 List A cricket games.

References

External links
 

1965 births
Living people
Pakistani cricketers
Pakistan Automobiles Corporation cricketers
Pakistan National Shipping Corporation cricketers
Cricketers from Karachi